"Intention" is a song by Bulgarian progressive rock supergroup Intelligent Music Project. The song represented Bulgaria in the Eurovision Song Contest 2022 after being internally selected by BNT, Bulgaria's broadcaster for the Eurovision Song Contest.

Background 
According to the band, the song is about confronting the challenges of life. The first verse talks about a troubled youth with trauma. However, during the pre-chorus, the person eventually comes to terms with their past, eventually having a feeling of strength of having overcome much adversity during the chorus. In the second verse, the song's lyrics become more positive, and the message of the power of intentions is carried through the verse. The song ends with the message that to escape the demons of the past, it is important to look towards the future.

Eurovision Song Contest

Selection 
In mid-September 2021, Intelligent Music Project founder Milen Vrabevski revealed to  that they had been selected to represent Bulgaria at the Eurovision Song Contest 2022. No official confirmation came until 25 November, when BNT announced the group as their representative for 2022 with the song "Intention".

At Eurovision 
According to Eurovision rules, all nations with the exceptions of the host country and the "Big Five" (France, Germany, Italy, Spain and the United Kingdom) are required to qualify from one of two semi-finals in order to compete for the final; the top ten countries from each semi-final progress to the final. The European Broadcasting Union (EBU) split up the competing countries into six different pots based on voting patterns from previous contests, with countries with favourable voting histories put into the same pot. On 25 January 2022, an allocation draw was held which placed each country into one of the two semi-finals, as well as which half of the show they would perform in. Bulgaria was placed into the first semi-final, held on 10 May 2022, and performed in the first half of the show.

References 

Eurovision songs of 2022
Eurovision songs of Bulgaria
2021 songs
2021 singles